Lieutenant Colonel Robert Walker-Brown, MBE, DSO (b. 9 April 1919, Sutton Coldfield, Warwickshire; d. 16 August 2009) was a British Army officer who served in the Special Air Service during World War II and afterwards. He escaped from an Italian prisoner of war camp in October 1943 and returned to the United Kingdom. Walker-Brown served in the Army until 1963 and had a short period in the Ministry of Defence.

External links
 Obituary in Daily Telegraph

1919 births
2009 deaths
People from Sutton Coldfield
People educated at Dulwich College
Special Air Service officers
Members of the Order of the British Empire
Companions of the Distinguished Service Order
British World War II prisoners of war